The 1941 Stanley Cup Finals was a best-of-seven series between the Boston Bruins and the Detroit Red Wings. Boston would win the series 4–0 to win their third Stanley Cup.

Paths to the Finals
Boston defeated the Toronto Maple Leafs in a best-of-seven 4–3 to advance to the Finals. The Red Wings had to play two best-of three series; winning 2–1 against the New York Rangers, and 2–0 against the Chicago Black Hawks to advance to the Finals.

Game summaries
In the third best-of-seven series, Boston became the first to sweep the series in four games.

Stanley Cup engraving
The 1941 Stanley Cup was presented to Bruins captain Dit Clapper by NHL President Frank Calder following the Bruins 3–1 win over the Red Wings in game four.

The following Bruins players and staff had their names engraved on the Stanley Cup

1940–41 Boston Bruins

See also
 1940–41 NHL season

References & notes

 Podnieks, Andrew; Hockey Hall of Fame (2004). Lord Stanley's Cup. Bolton, Ont.: Fenn Pub. pp 12, 50. 

Stanley Cup
Stanley Cup Finals
Boston Bruins games
Detroit Red Wings games
April 1941 sports events
Ice hockey competitions in Detroit
Ice hockey competitions in Boston
Stanley Cup
1941 in sports in Massachusetts
1941 in Detroit
1940s in Boston
Boston Garden